The Wadi Avedji is a tributary of the upper Khabur River in northeastern Syria.

References

Avedji
Tributaries of the Khabur (Euphrates)